Bestival 2010 was the seventh installment of the Bestival, a boutique music festival held at Robin Hill Country Park on the Isle of Wight. The festival, organized by Rob and Josie Da Bank and their crew, was held over the weekend between 9 September and 12 September 2010. It was voted the best major UK festival in the UK festival awards. This is the first time it has won the major festival award, rather than the medium-sized festival award. Each year a fancy dress theme is announced; 2010 was the year of the fantastic and so festival goers dressed in fantasy outfits. The festival boasts its own radio station called Bestival Radio. The station was broadcast on-site, played music and kept listeners camping at the festival up-to-date on news and events over the weekend. The first acts were announced on 4 February.

Bestival 2010 was composed, like the years before, of several areas with different topic:
 FANTASY FIELD hosting the Main stage, the Big Top
 FIRE FIELD hosting the Arcadia's Spider (a flame spurting 15-metre high metal spider!)
 BOLLYWOOD FIELD hosting the big Bollywood bar tent designed by Josie da Bank
 MAGIC MEADOW hosting the Rock'n'Roll stage and the psychedelic Fantasy Castle Bonfire built on an apple core of earth
 THE WISHING TREE FIELD hosting the Cabaret tent, the party tent Chai Wallahs and the Wishing Tree (an 8-metre tall, triple-tier tree)
 TOMORROW'S WORLD: a sustainable and green vision of the future. Hosting the Solar Powered Bandstand and the Plugged In Eco-House supported by Scottish and Southern Energy, the Eden Project, the Science Museum Tent, the Gazebo in the Woods, the 3-D audio visual sculpture made by the members of the band The XX and many others projects

Line up
Dizzee Rascal, Flaming Lips, Hot Chip, Roxy Music, The Prodigy, LCD Soundsystem, Flying Lotus, The Gaslamp Killer, Richie Hawtin present Plastikman, Four Tet, Caribou, Mount Kimbie, Joy Orbison, Magda, Zero 7, Nathan Fake, Dave Clarke, Tensnake, Skream, Shy FX, Joker, David Rodigan, Ulrich Schnauss, Gil Scott-Heron, Wailers Band, Chase & Status, Echo & the Bunnymen, Simian Mobile Disco, Delphic, Rolf Harris, Marc Almond, Ellie Goulding, Mumford & Sons, The Temper Trap, The XX, Fever Ray, Tricky, Example, Heaven 17 and many others

Main stage
Friday
 Dizzee Rascal
 Hot Chip
 Simian Mobile Disco
 Gil Scott-Heron
 dan le sac vs Scroobius Pip
 The Jolly Boys
 Example
 Barry Peters
 Level 42

Saturday

 The Flaming Lips
 Roxy Music
 Mumford & Sons
 The Correspondents
 Ellie Goulding
 The Wailers
 Rolf Harris
 Stornoway
 Eliza Doolittle
 Rox
 Portico Quartet

Sunday
 The Prodigy
 Chase & Status
 Chic Feat. Nile Rodgers
 Echo & The Bunnymen
 Marc Almond
 The Cuban Brothers
 Beth Jeans Houghtin
 Lucky Elephant
 Gaggle

Big Top
Thursday
 Heaven 17
 Back To The Phuture
 Janelle Monáe

Friday
 Plastikman
 Tricky
 Flying Lotus
 The XX
 Joy Orbison
 Delphic
 Wild Beasts
 Four Tet
 Ulrich Schnauss

Saturday
 Erol Alkan
 Mylo
 Jónsi (Sigur Rós)
 Annie Mac
 Everything Everything
 Cornershop
 Hurts

Sunday
 LCD Soundsystem
 Fever Ray
 Vitalic
 Fat Freddy's Drop
 Beardyman
 Tunng

References

External links
 Official Bestival website
 Resident Advisor presentation
 Resident Advisor article
 Resident Advisor article

Music festivals on the Isle of Wight
2010 in British music
2010 in England